Ezio Galon (born 22 July 1977) is a former Italian rugby union player.

He played for Mogliano Rugby in the Excellence competition. A native of Treviso, he formerly played for Rugby Parma and, in 2000-2005, in the French sides of  Bourgoin-Jallieu (2000–2001), La Rochelle (2001–2004, with whom he won two French Cups) and Lyon OU (2004–2005).

Ezio Galon's position of choice is as a full-back, but he is comfortable operating as a centre or on the wing.

He played for Italy in the 2006, 2007 and 2008 tournaments. He was called for the 2007 Rugby World Cup.

After being the Assistant and Head Coach for Mogliano Rugby, he became Assistant Coach for Benetton Treviso for the 2016-17 season.

References

External links
 
Parma Rugby profile
RBS 6 Nations profile

1977 births
Living people
Sportspeople from Treviso
Italian rugby union players
Stade Rochelais players
Benetton Rugby players
Italy international rugby union players
Rugby union fullbacks